DNA-directed RNA polymerase I subunit RPA1 is an enzyme that in humans is encoded by the POLR1A gene.

References

Further reading